Hans-Peter Berger (born 28 September 1981) is an Austrian professional footballer who plays for Salzburger AK 1914 as a goalkeeper.

Club career
Born in Salzburg, Berger played for several clubs in his homeland, competing in all three major levels. He appeared in 102 Bundesliga games in his career, mainly with SV Ried which he helped to the second position in the 2006–07 season, whilst being named Goalkeeper of the Year in the process.

From 2008 to 2010, Berger represented Leixões S.C. in the Portuguese Primeira Liga. During his spell in Matosinhos, he played second-fiddle to Beto and Diego.

Personal life
Berger's younger brother, Markus, was also a footballer.

Honours
Pasching
Austrian Cup: 2012–13

References

External links
Leixões official profile 

Official website 

1981 births
Living people
Footballers from Salzburg
Austrian footballers
Association football goalkeepers
Austrian Football Bundesliga players
2. Liga (Austria) players
FC Red Bull Salzburg players
LASK players
SV Ried players
FC Admira Wacker Mödling players
FC Juniors OÖ players
SV Grödig players
Primeira Liga players
Leixões S.C. players
Austria under-21 international footballers
Austrian expatriate footballers
Expatriate footballers in Portugal
Austrian expatriate sportspeople in Portugal